June Elizabeth Edney (born 27 April 1956) is an English former cricketer who played as a right-handed batter and wicket-keeper. She appeared in 8 Test matches and 6 One Day Internationals for England between 1984 and 1985. She played domestic cricket for Kent.

References

External links
 
 

Living people
1956 births
People from Folkestone
England women Test cricketers
England women One Day International cricketers
Kent women cricketers